In the Government of Australia, the Minister for Education administers the Department of Education. The position is held by Labor MP Jason Clare, following the Australian federal election in 2022.

Portfolio scope
The Minister is responsible for a number of areas, including:

Education policy and programs including schools, vocational, higher education and Indigenous education, but excluding migrant adult education
Education and training transitions policy and programs
Science awareness programs in schools
Training, including apprenticeships and training services
Policy, co-ordination and support for education exports and services
Income support policies and programs for students and apprentices

List of ministers for education
The persons who have been Ministers for Education are as follows:

Notes
 Whitlam was part of a two-man ministry comprising himself and Lance Barnard for fourteen days until the full ministry was commissioned.
 Despite the First Rudd Ministry ending on 24 June 2010, Gillard was Minister for Education for four days in her first ministry, between 24 June and 28 June 2010, when the revised ministry was commissioned.

List of ministers for youth
There have been several portfolios to include the term "youth", sometimes separate from or under education portfolios. The following individuals have been appointed as Ministers with various titles that have included the word "youth":

List of ministers for vocational education and skills
The following individuals have been appointed as Minister for Vocational Education and Skills, or any of its precedent titles:

List of assistant ministers
The following individuals have been appointed as Assistant Minister for Education and Training, or any of its precedent titles:

References

External links
 

Education
Australia